Murali Kumar Gavit (born 8 January 1997) is an Indian long-distance runner. He won the bronze medal in the men's 10,000 metres event at 2019 Asian Athletics Championships.

References

External links
 

1997 births
Living people
Athletes from Gujarat
People from Dang district, India
Indian male long-distance runners